Kaplan Kirsch & Rockwell LLP is a national law firm headquartered in Denver, Colorado, with additional offices in Washington, D.C., New York City, and Boston.  It was established in 2003 by a group of attorneys. The firm focuses on solving problems that involve environmental, land use, public and private lands, infrastructure, and transportation law.

History and Formation 
Kaplan Kirsch & Rockwell was founded in 2003 by a group of six attorneys, most of whom had previously practiced at a boutique environmental law firm until its 2000 merger with a large international law firm.  All of the founding partners practiced transportation, infrastructure, land use, and environmental law, with a focus on large public development projects and private sector projects with a significant public investment component. At the time of its founding, the firm's attorneys had all built national reputations in transit-oriented and brownfield development, in environmental law, and in airport development projects.  The firm later grew to incorporate transit and rail projects in 2006 and public-private partnerships in 2017.

Notable Projects

Airports 
Starting in the late 1990s, members of the firm led negotiations for a 7-year standstill between the Hollywood Burbank Airport and the city of Los Angeles that led to a development agreement that allowed terminal improvements to meet contemporary design and security needs.  The principle was that a standstill or détente might reduce tensions and pave the way for a long-term peace between the airport and its neighbors, which proved to be successful. Most recently, Kaplan Kirsch & Rockwell led the City in negotiations for a final resolution of the 45-year dispute.  This  agreement changes the governance of the Airport Authority to give city appointees greater influence over major airport decisions, provides for a development agreement for the replacement of the airport terminal on a new site, enables the use of adjacent property for airport-oriented commercial development, and approves the replacement terminal.  The final set of agreements was approved by the voters in a referendum in November 2016.

In 2013, the firm successfully led a coalition of more than 40 small commercial service airports in litigation and an aggressive legislative effort to reinstate funding for federal contract air traffic control towers after federal sequestration cuts would have eliminated towers at 250 airports nationwide.  The firm filed multiple lawsuits in many federal courts of appeals, assisted in developing a public communications strategy, and helped lead a legislative lobbying and communications strategy in the Congress with active involvement by the American Association of Airport Executives and state aviation groups.

The firm has represented Clark County, Nevada, owner of the Las Vegas McCarran International Airport, for decades in a variety of matters; including a 2011 petition concerning its proposal to discount airline landing fees in the event that the airline increases its landed weight. Additionally, the firm supervised the preparation and approval of environmental assessments associated with airfield and terminal improvements at McCarran, advised on the management, use, and disposition of Bureau of Land Management  lands needed for airport development, and provided continuing counsel on matters relating to noise, air quality compliance, coordination of development and potential height and obstruction impacts on airport operations, as well as general federal regulatory compliance issues.

Rail, Transit, Highways, and Infrastructure 
Beginning in 2006, the firm became involved in the Denver Union Station Site Redevelopment, representing the master developer and developing plans for the light rail, commuter rail, AMTRAK, and bus operations. In 2011, the firm served as part of the legal team that represented the Regional Transportation District (RTD) on the EAGLE P3 Project, a $2 billion commuter rail project, with the main line running from Denver Union Station to Denver International Airport.

In 2015, the firm was retained by the city of Albuquerque, New Mexico, to assist in a lawsuit brought by two groups of plaintiffs representing individuals and businesses along Central Avenue seeking an injunction to stop construction of the Albuquerque Rapid Transit (ART). The firm was able to obtain an accelerated schedule on Plaintiffs’ Motions for Preliminary Injunction and after an accelerated briefing schedule and a three-day evidentiary hearing, Judge Kenneth Gonzales of the U.S. District Court for New Mexico issued a 14-page decision denying the injunction and finding, in particular, that allowing ART to proceed was in the public interest.

The firm provided counsel to the Maryland Transit Administration (MTA) in the acquisition of rights-of-way from two Class 1 freight railroads for the state's use in developing the Red Line light rail corridor in Baltimore and the Purple Line light rail inter-county connector in Montgomery and Prince George's Counties. MTA was represented by the firm in extensive proceedings before the Surface Transportation Board and federal circuit courts in connection with MTA's acquisition and development of its commuter and light rail systems and its efforts to railbank unused corridors, and also assisted MTA in compliance matters before the Federal Railroad Administration.

The firm represented King County, Washington, in contested proceedings before the Surface Transportation Board to secure approval as the trail sponsor under the National Trails Act. King County had to defend the trail from attacks by neighboring landowners asserting reversionary property interests in the railbanked right-of-way and two attempts by start-up railroads to obtain rights to use the right-of-way based on speculative plans to provide freight rail service in suburban Seattle.

In 2016, the DC Department of Transportation (DDOT) announced the return of DC streetcars to Washington, D.C., after a hiatus of over 50 years, and the firm assisted DDOT in negotiations with the Federal Transit Administration and the local safety oversight agency to establish safety management systems for the new service.

In early 2018, the firm helped its client the Colorado Department of Transportation (CDOT), with a proposed reconstruction a 10-mile stretch of I-70 east of downtown Denver. Opponents of the re-design filed two lawsuits, claiming that CDOT had failed to properly analyze the environmental impacts of the project under the National Environmental Policy Act and the Clean Air Act.  After reviewing briefings from firm attorneys, the court denied both preliminary injunction motions. In its orders, the court held that the plaintiffs are unlikely to succeed on the merits of any of their legal claims, including claims that the Federal Highway Administration and CDOT had insufficiently considered the Project's impacts on air quality and public health.

Environment, Public Lands, and Conservation 
Beginning in 2008, the firm represented a local government in western Colorado in litigation over the validity of water rights speculatively held by other entities in the watershed and were able to achieve a strong settlement that eliminated two major dam sites on this free-flowing river–one that is eligible for designation as a National Wild and Scenic River.

In 2014 it was announced that the city of Denver would begin redevelopment of the Former Gates Rubber Company Site, and the firm was brought on to assist in the negotiation of the purchase and sale agreement, project due diligence, negotiation of the environmental insurance policy, environmental cleanup and risk management, entitlements, use of special district and tax increment financing, railroad right-of-way issues, transit-oriented development, and private project financing.

The firm represented the local redevelopment authority known as PuebloPlex in negotiating with the U.S. Army and the Colorado Department of Public Health and Environment regarding cleanup requirements and other environmental terms and conditions associated with the transfer to PuebloPlex of approximately 16,000 acres of property within the former U.S. Army Pueblo Chemical Depot in Pueblo, Colorado.

In 2017, the City and County of Denver announced it would begin a 100-year contract with the National Western Center, and the firm was involved as council in developing and negotiating the governance structure and framework agreement for expanding and redeveloping the site.

Conservation Easements 
The firm represented Walking Mountains Science Center in its conveyance of a conservation easement to the Eagle Valley Land Trust in Edwards, Colorado, funded in part by Eagle County's Open Space Program. This relatively small transaction is focused on conserving the pristine riparian habitat of Buck Creek Valley for educating the public in nature, science, and conservation and the firm aided in furthering environmental stewardship and inspiring sustainability for the current generation as well as the next.

Last Dollar Ranch, located on the Dallas Divide near Telluride, Colorado, retained Kaplan Kirsch & Rockwell in the conveyance of a conservation easement to the American Farmland Trust.  The firm worked with various experts, including the appraiser, biologist, surveyor, and title insurance company and eventually the easement doubled the amount of protected land.

In 2016, the firm represented the owners of the Navajo Headwaters Ranch in the conveyance of several conservation easements to Colorado Open Lands, facilitated by The Conservation Fund. The land is located in the southern San Juan Mountains of southern Colorado, and the team worked on several corporate and debt related issues while taking advantage of the Colorado Conservation Easement Tax Credit.

Energy 
The firm represented Interwest Energy Alliance, the regional affiliate of the American Wind Energy Association, as an intervenor in the case EELI v. Epel, to help the state of Colorado defend against claims that the Colorado Renewable Energy Standard is unconstitutional. The Tenth Circuit agreed with the state of Colorado, Interwest, and other intervenors that the Colorado standard is constitutional because the RES does not attempt to regulate activity entirely outside of Colorado and does not control prices.

In August 2015, Xcel Energy filed a settlement agreement with the Colorado Public Utilities Commission that will impact how electricity is produced and paid for in Colorado. The firm represented the Solar Energy Industries Association in the months of negotiations that lead to this agreement. The settlement expands solar access to low-income customers and significantly increases Colorado's capacity for solar energy by facilitating the development of a new 50-megawatt solar facility, providing for the acquisition of more than 300 megawatts of community solar gardens and distributed solar in a move that was deemed a big win for the solar industry.

Professional Affiliations 
The firm and its attorneys maintain memberships and affiliations in a number of professional organizations, including:

National and international organizations 

 Aircraft Owners and Pilots Association
 Airports Council International - North America
 American Association of Airport Executives
 American Bar Association (and sections)
 American Planning Association
 American Public Transportation Association
 Land Trust Alliance
 Transportation Research Board
 Urban Land Institute

Regional and local organizations 

 Colorado Bar Association
 Denver Metro Chamber of Commerce
 District of Columbia Bar Association
 Downtown Denver Partnership
 Florida Airports Council
 Rocky Mountain Land Use Institute

Bar and legal organizations 

 20th Judicial District Nominating Commission (Polly Jessen) 
 American Bar Association, Technology Chair, Forum on Air & Space Law, Chair (Steven Osit)
 Association of Transportation Law Professionals (Editor for Highlights Commuter Rail Column; Program Chair, Annual Meeting 2013, Chuck Spitulnik; Program Chair, Annual Meeting 2015, Allison Fultz)
 Civil Justice Reform Act Advisory Group (Lori Potter)
 Cleantech and Climate Change Committee, ABA Section of Science & Technology, Co-chair (Heather Haney)
 Energy Bar Association (Sarah Keane)
 Faculty of Federal Advocates, co-founder and Board Member (Lori Potter)
 Federal Bar Association, Board Member, Transportation and Transportation Security Law Section (Steven Osit)
 International Municipal Lawyers Association, chair, Transportation Section (Peter Kirsch)

Industry-affiliated organizations 

 Aviation Council of Pennsylvania, Board Member (Eric Smith)
 Colorado Chapter of the National Brownfield Association, Executive Committee Member; Policy and Legislative Subcommittee co-chair (Polly Jessen)
 National Civil Aviation Review Commission (Mineta Commission), Vice Chair (Steve Kaplan)
 Transportation Research Board – Committee on Transit and Intermodal Transportation Law (Allison Fultz)
 Young Professionals in Transportation, Member (Christian Alexander)

Community, educational, and civic organizations 

 Boulder Cycling Club, High Ride Ambassador; Board Member (Nick Clabbers)
 Brian Anselmino Memorial Fund, Board Member (Eric Smith)
 Bromwell School CDM (Governance) Committee, Chair (Peter Kirsch)
 Businesses Unified for Denver Public Schools Committee (Polly Jessen)
 Capitol Hill South Advisory Neighborhood Commission, Planning and Zoning Committee, Member (Christian Alexander)
 Children's Museum of Denver, Board of Directors (Steve Kaplan)
 City and County of Denver Infrastructure Priorities Task Force/City Facilities Subcommittee (Sarah Rockwell)
 Colorado Rugby, Board of Directors (Heather Haney)
 Colorado ULI Technical Advisory Panels (Sarah Rockwell)
 Denver Civic Ventures, Board of Directors (Sarah Rockwell)
 Denver County Cultural Council (Peter Kirsch)
 Denver Museum of Contemporary Art, Board of Trustees (Peter Kirsch)
 Denver Public Schools Bond Oversight Committee (Steve Kaplan)
 Denver Union Station Project Authority Board (Steve Kaplan)
 Denver Zoning Code Task Force (Steve Kaplan)
 Denver Zoo, Board Member (Steve Kaplan)
 Downtown Denver Annual Awards Jury (Polly Jessen)
 Downtown Denver Leadership Program (Polly Jessen)
 Downtown Denver Partnership, Housing Policy Task Force, Chair (Sarah Rockwell)
 Downtown Denver Partnership, Management Group (Sarah Rockwell)
 Lowry Redevelopment Authority, chair and Member (Sarah Rockwell)
 Mayor's Development Advisory Group, Member (Steve Kaplan)
 Mile High Montessori Early Learning Centers, Board Member (Sarah Rockwell)
 Montessori Academy of Colorado (Katie van Heuven)
 Montgomery County Board of Appeals (Allison Fultz)
 The Musical Theater Center (now Adventure Theater MTC) (Chuck Spitulnik)
 Pittsburgh Human Resources Association, Member (Eric Smith)
 Potomac Pedalers Touring Club, Board Member (Eric Pilsk)
 SafeHouse Denver, Former Member (Steve Kaplan)
 University of Colorado Law School Orientation Leadership Program (Nick Clabbers)
 University of Colorado Leeds School of Business - 50 for Colorado Leadership Development Program (Katie van Heuven)
 Washington Waldorf School Trustees Council (Chair – Allison Fultz; Adjunct Faculty, Board of Directors, Chairman – Chuck Spitulnik)
 Winter Park Recreational Association, Board of Directors; President (Sarah Rockwell)

Local environmental and advocacy organizations 

 Center for ReSource Conservation (Polly Jessen)
 Colorado Coalition of Land Trusts, Counsel (Bill Silberstein)
 Colorado Conservation Voters, Board of Directors (Peter Kirsch)
 Colorado Environmental Coalition, Board of Directors (Lori Potter)
 Colorado I Have a Dream Foundation, Board of Directors; Former President (Steve Kaplan)
 Colorado Preservation, Inc., Board Member (Sarah Rockwell)
 Conservation Colorado, Board of Directors (Peter Kirsch)
 Denver Botanic Gardens, Board of Trustees (Peter Kirsch)
 Elephant Energy Eagle Energy Program, Volunteer Interim Program Director (Christian Alexander)
 Front Range Earth Force, Board of Directors (Lori Potter)
 Public Counsel of the Rockies, Board of Directors (Lori Potter)
 Rivers Alive, Board Member (Nate Hunt)
 Savannah Riverkeeper, Board Member (Nate Hunt)
 Trust for Public Land, Colorado Board (Peter Kirsch)
 Volunteers for Outdoor Colorado, Board of Directors (Peter Kirsch; Sarah Rockwell)

National organizations 

 Earthjustice, Board of Directors (Lori Potter)
 Land Trust Alliance Conservation Defense Committee and Council (Bill Silberstein)
 Oberlin College (Alumni Association President – Peter Kirsch, Chuck Spitulnik; Board of Trustees – Peter Kirsch)
 River Network, Board of Trustees; Chair (Peter Kirsch)
 Society for Human Resource Management, Member (Eric Smith)
 Turnaround Management Association, Member (Eric Smith)
 Yale University Alumni Schools Committee (Katie van Heuven)

Recognition 
Kaplan Kirsch & Rockwell considers community, civic, and charitable leadership indispensable to developing effective attorneys and counselors and was awarded the Legal Aid Foundation Associates Campaign Award as Champions of Justice in 2009-2012 for having the highest firm per capita gift to the Legal Aid Foundation of Colorado. In 2013, the firm tied for having the highest firm per capita gift; in 2014, Kaplan Kirsch & Rockwell was ranked in the top three for the highest firm per capita gift.

References

External links 
 Official website

2003 establishments in Colorado
Law firms based in Denver